The Callama River is a river in the Potosí Department of Bolivia.

See also
List of rivers of Bolivia

References
Rand McNally, The New International Atlas, 1993.

Calama